The 2004–05 CERH European League was the 40th edition of the CERH European League organized by CERH. Its Final Four was held on 14 and 15 May 2007 at the Pavelló d'Esports, in Reus, Spain.

Preliminary round
The eliminated teams joined the CERS Cup. Uttigen received a wildcard after the draw.

|}

Group stage
In each group, teams played against each other home-and-away in a home-and-away round-robin format.

The two first qualified teams advanced to the Final Four.

Group A

Group B

Final four
The Final Four was played at Pavelló Olímpic, in Reus, Spain.

Barcelona achieved its 16th title.

Bracket

External links
 CERH website
 Results at Rinkhockey.net

2004 in roller hockey
2005 in roller hockey
Rink Hockey Euroleague